Lancaster railway station (formerly known as Lancaster Castle railway station) is a railway station that serves the city of Lancaster in Lancashire, England. It is one of the principal stations on the West Coast Main Line.

History

Originally known as 'Lancaster Castle Station' in order to distinguish it from the first Lancaster Station (1840–1849), Lancaster station was officially opened on 21 September 1846. The first public service ran into the station on 17 December the same year. The station was built as the southern terminus of the Lancaster and Carlisle Railway after the initial planned route for the line - which would have followed the Lancaster Canal and crossing the River Lune from Ladies Walk to Skerton - was changed in favour of a cheaper route west of the city.

The station was remodelled in 1900-1906 when additional lines and platforms were added and further station buildings constructed. The new buildings were styled mock-Elizabethan with the intention of mirroring the battlements of the nearby Lancaster Castle. Platforms 5 and 6 (on the east side of the station) were electrified in 1908 to serve the now-closed Midland Railway route to Morecambe and Heysham. This line closed in January 1966 and the overhead line equipment was removed.

The track layout in the station area was rationalised in 1973 when control of the signalling was transferred to the new Preston Power Signal Box. This included the removal of the track from Platform 6, although this platform had seen no regular use for some time prior to this. The West Coast Main Line through Lancaster was electrified in 1974, and regular electric passenger services recommenced at the station 7 May 1974.

Description
The main building constructed in 1846 by William Tite was situated on the west side of the line in Tudor Revival style using roughly squared sandstone rubble. This two-storey building was extended southwards in 1852 in similar style although this section terminated in a tower of three storeys. A new entrance was constructed in 1900 on the eastern side of the line at footbridge level; this is nearer the town and houses the remaining ticket office.

The booking office is open throughout the week, closing only in the late evening (ticket machines are also available). A full range of facilities is offered, including a newsagents whilst there is also a buffet, waiting rooms and toilets on both sides and lifts between the footbridge and platforms. The station is therefore fully accessible for disabled passengers. The entrance through the original building remains open. This opens onto Platform 3 which is mostly used by northbound services.

Two through lines without platforms separate these three platforms from the remainder of the station; these are used by non-stop passenger services and freight trains. Beyond is Platform 4, which is the principal one used by southbound trains but as with platform 3 it can be used for trains going on both directions. This is an island platform with a second face, Platform 5, which can be used by both northbound and southbound trains or by terminating services. All platforms are signalled for arrivals and departures in either direction. Opposite Platform 5 are the remains of Platform 6 which has no track and has been out of use for many years.

Services

Lancaster is served by several train operators.

Avanti West Coast operate express trains from London Euston to Edinburgh Waverley and Glasgow Central using Class 390 Pendolinos, and Class 221 Super Voyagers. A few services to/from  also terminate/start at Lancaster. These services normally use platforms 3 and 4.

These services also use platforms 3 and 4.

These services are operated using DMUs of Classes 150, 153, 156, 158 and 195s. Through services use the same platforms as Avanti West Coast and TransPennine Express trains, whilst those starting & terminating here mostly use platforms 1, 2 and 5. Nuclear flask trains serving Heysham power station are the other main users of the Heysham branch.

See also

Listed buildings in Lancaster, Lancashire

References

External links

Lancaster Stations

Railway stations in Lancaster
DfT Category B stations
Former Lancaster and Carlisle Railway stations
Railway stations in Great Britain opened in 1846
Railway stations served by TransPennine Express
Northern franchise railway stations
Railway stations served by Avanti West Coast
1846 establishments in England
Grade II listed buildings in Lancashire
William Tite railway stations
Stations on the West Coast Main Line